Margaret (Mandy) MacLean  is an expert in pulmonary pharmacology. She is renowned for her work on the role of sex effects and serotonin in metabolising oestrogen, also for identifying target enzymes for the treatment of pulmonary arterial hypertension. MacLean is currently a Professor of Pulmonary Pharmacology in the Strathclyde Institute of Pharmacy and Biomedical Sciences at the University of Strathclyde Glasgow.

MacLean was awarded the MBE in the 2010 Queen’s New Year Honours list. In 2013, MacLean was elected Fellow of The Royal Society of Edinburgh (FRSE) and received the British Pharmacological Society AstraZeneca Prize for Women in Pharmacology. In 2018, she was made a Fellow of the Academy of Medical Sciences (FMedSci) and was appointed Scottish Champion for the Academy of Medical Sciences for her efforts in science communication.

References 

Women pharmacologists
Fellows of the Academy of Medical Sciences (United Kingdom)
Members of the Order of the British Empire
Fellows of the Royal Society of Edinburgh
Year of birth missing (living people)
Living people
Academics of the University of Strathclyde
Alumni of the University of Edinburgh